Philhelius pedissequus is a species of hoverfly. Prior to 2018, it was known under the genus name Xanthogramma, a junior synonym.

Etymology
The Latin species name pedissequus means that follows on foot, like an attendant.

Distribution and habitat
This uncommon species is present in most of Europe, in Western Siberia, in the Near East and in North Africa. It prefers grassland, open fields close to deciduous forest.

Description

These hoverflies have a black body, with two yellow lateral stripes on the thorax, and yellow markings on tergites  two to five. The pairs of tergites 2 are wedge-shaped and considerably wide.

Biology
Flight period last from mid May through September, with a peak at the end of June. The adults feed on different flowers, for example, Ballota nigra, Potentilla erecta and Heracleum sphondylium. Little is known of its larval stages. Larvae have been found underground in nests of the black garden ant (Lasius niger) and yellow meadow ant (Lasius flavus), probably to feed on ant-attended root aphids Forda formicaria and Trama species that they collect.

References

Syrphinae
Diptera of Africa
Diptera of Asia
Diptera of Europe
Insects described in 1776
Articles containing video clips
Taxa named by Moses Harris